John Muhato (1 February 1954 – 2005) was a Kenyan sports shooter. He competed in the 50 metre rifle, three positions event at the 1972 Summer Olympics.

References

1954 births
2005 deaths
Kenyan male sport shooters
Olympic shooters of Kenya
Shooters at the 1972 Summer Olympics
Place of birth missing